Eleanor Elizabeth Bryce Campbell FRSE FRS FRSC FInstP (born 13 April 1960) is a Scottish scientist who holds the Chair of Chemistry at the University of Edinburgh.

Education
Campbell was born in 1960 in Rothesay on the Isle of Bute in Scotland to Isobel and William Cowan. She was schooled at Rothesay Academy before going on to study for a BSc in Chemical Physics at the University of Edinburgh, passing with first class honours in 1982. She remained at the university for further 3 years studying for a PhD, which she gained in 1986, on the topic of Electronic to rovibrational excitation in fast atom-molecule collisions. She then went to the University of Freiburg having received a habilitation in experimental physics.

Academic career
After her time as assistant professor at the University of Freiburg, Campbell became a departmental head at the Max-Born Institut in 1993. In 1998 she was made Chair of Atomic and Molecular Physics at Gothenburg University, Sweden before returning to the University of Edinburgh in to take up a post as Chair of Physical Chemistry in 2007 and then Chair of Chemistry 2013.

Campbell was elected as a Foreign Member of the Royal Swedish Academy of Sciences (physics class) in 2005 and a Fellow of the Royal Society of Edinburgh in 2004. In 2010 she was elected a Fellow of the Royal Society for her contribution to the understanding of relaxation channels and reorganisational dynamics of highly excited molecules and surfaces through experimental research. She was made a Fellow of the Royal Society of Chemistry and a Fellow of the Institute of Physics in 2008.

Current work 
Campbell's group at the University of Edinburgh study the fundamental ionisation mechanisms and excited state dynamics of complex molecules in the gas phase using femtosecond laser spectroscopy. They also study carbon nanomaterials and develop microporous carbon-based materials for gas capture and storage.

References 

Scottish women scientists
Scottish women chemists
Scottish chemists
Scottish physical chemists
Female Fellows of the Royal Society
Living people
People from the Isle of Bute
People educated at Rothesay Academy
Alumni of the University of Edinburgh
Academic staff of the University of Freiburg
Academics of the University of Edinburgh
Fellows of the Royal Society of Chemistry
Fellows of the Institute of Physics
Fellows of the Royal Society
1960 births
Scottish women academics
Members of the Royal Swedish Academy of Sciences